Tamamo Cross (in Japanese: タマモクロス; 23 May 1984 – 10 April 2003) is a Japanese Thoroughbred racehorse who won the multiple Grade 1 titles.

Career

Tamamo's first race was on November 1st, 1987 at the Fujinomori Tokubetsu, which he won. He then won the 1987 Naruo Kinen on December 6th.  He followed that up on January 5, 1988 by winning the 1988 Sports Nippon Sho Kim Pai. He then won the Hanshin Daishoten on March 13, 1988.

Tamamo competed in his first Grade 1 races in 1988. He won both the Spring and Autumn edition of the 1988 Tenno Sho. He came in 2nd in both the 1988 Japan Cup and the 1988 Arima Kinen, which was his final race.

For his efforts, he won the 1988 Japanese Horse of the Year.

Broodmare
Tamamo Cross's descendants include:

c = colt, f = filly

Pedigree

References

1984 racehorse births
2003 racehorse deaths
Racehorses bred in Japan
Racehorses trained in Japan
Thoroughbred family 21-a